Margaret McKenna is a civil rights attorney and academic and former president of Suffolk University in Boston, Massachusetts. She previously served as president of Lesley University, president of the Wal-Mart Foundation, a professor at Brandeis University, a vice-president at Harvard University, and an official in the Clinton administration.

McKenna received her B.A. from Emmanuel College in Boston, Massachusetts, and her J.D. from Southern Methodist University in Dallas, Texas. She worked as a civil rights attorney early in her career, eventually becoming deputy counsel in the White House and later undersecretary of the U.S. Department of Education, where she led the education transition team for President Bill Clinton. McKenna also served as president of Lesley University and was affiliated with Lesley for 22 years.  She was also president of the Wal-Mart Foundation from 2007 to 2011, a professor and director at Brandeis University, a vice-president at the Radcliffe Institute of Harvard University, and a vice-chair of the board at Beth Israel Deaconess Medical Center.

McKenna was appointed president of Suffolk University in July 2015, but on February 5, 2016, she announced her resignation from her post, following a deadlock with the university's Board of Trustees over their quest to remove her from office. She stepped down before the start of Suffolk's 2017-2018 academic year. Concurrently, Board of Trustees Chairman Andrew Meyer, Jr., announced his plans not to seek re-election after his term expired in May 2016.

References

Southern Methodist University alumni
Heads of universities and colleges in the United States
Presidents of Suffolk University
Living people
Year of birth missing (living people)